Bruce Pennington (born 10 May 1944, in Somerset, England) is a British painter, best known for his science fiction and fantasy novel cover art. Pennington's works have largely featured on the covers of novels of Isaac Asimov, Clark Ashton Smith and Robert A. Heinlein, adopting both science fiction and fantastical themes. His past of speculation and youthful wonderment lead to his current outlandish form and style.

Pennington's works are largely characterised by bold, daring colours; rich pinks and blues sustaining his continuing motifs of speculation as well as precise brush strokes, harmonious pigment blending as well as the acute concentration in the detail of his depicted subjects, usually landscapes of other times or worlds.

Pennington attended the Ravensbourne School of Art in Bromley during the early 1960s. He began working as a freelance illustrator in 1967. In 1976, Paper Tiger Books published an LP-sized graphic album, Eschatus, featuring Pennington's paintings inspired by the prophecies of Nostradamus. They followed this, in 1991, with a graphic album, Ultraterranium, collecting various private and commercial works.

Selected works
 The Defence by Vladimir Nabokov, Panther Books, 1967
 Stranger in a Strange Land by Robert Heinlein, New English Library. 1970
Dune by Frank Herbert
Dune Messiah by Frank Herbert
Children of Dune by Frank Herbert
God Emperor of Dune by Frank Herbert
Heretics of Dune by Frank Herbert
Chapterhouse: Dune by Frank Herbert
The Shadow of the Torturer by Gene Wolfe (1981 BSFA Award)

References

External links
 The Art of Bruce Pennington (official site)
 
 Gallery of his work taken from Ultraterraneum

1944 births
Living people
People from Somerset
British speculative fiction artists
20th-century British painters
British male painters
21st-century British painters
British illustrators
Science fiction artists
Fantasy artists
Artists from Somerset
BSFA Award for Best Artwork winner
20th-century British male artists
21st-century British male artists